Mesoclupea showchangensis is an extinct ichthyodectiform ray-finned fish that lived in freshwater environments in what is now China during the Early Cretaceous epoch.  It differs from its sister genus, Chuhsiungichthys, primarily by having a more posteriorly-placed dorsal fin.

See also

 Prehistoric fish
 List of prehistoric bony fish

References

Ichthyodectiformes
Early Cretaceous fish
Prehistoric animals of China
Prehistoric ray-finned fish genera